The Citadel of Tus ( Arg-e Tus) is a citadel from the Sassanid era, located in Tus, in Razavi Khorasan province of Iran.

It is made of brick and is rectangular in shape, having four circular towers at each corner, with two more circular towers in the inner structure. Not much remains of the structure; however, its size is comparable to other large citadels of the Sassanid era of Iran.

See also
 List of Iranian castles
 Iranian architecture

References

External links
Another webpage about the castle

Sasanian castles
Castles in Iran
Architecture in Iran
Buildings and structures in Razavi Khorasan Province

National works of Iran